Universal Flash Storage (UFS) is a flash storage specification for digital cameras, mobile phones and consumer electronic devices. It was designed to bring higher data transfer speed and increased reliability to flash memory storage, while reducing market confusion and removing the need for different adapters for different types of cards. The standard encompasses both packages permanently attached (embedded) within a device, and removable UFS memory cards.

Overview
UFS uses NAND flash. It may use multiple stacked 3D TLC NAND flash dies (integrated circuits) with an integrated controller.

The proposed flash memory specification is supported by consumer electronics companies such as Nokia, Sony Ericsson, Texas Instruments, STMicroelectronics, Samsung, Micron, and SK Hynix. The electrical interface for UFS uses the M-PHY, developed by the MIPI Alliance, a high-speed serial interface targeting 2.9 Gbit/s per lane with up-scalability to 5.8 Gbit/s per lane. Unlike eMMC, Universal Flash Storage is based on the SCSI architectural model and supports SCSI Tagged Command Queuing. The standard is developed by, and available from, the JEDEC Solid State Technology Association.

The Linux kernel supports UFS.

History
In 2010, the Universal Flash Storage Association (UFSA) was founded as an open trade association to promote the UFS standard.

In September 2013, JEDEC published JESD220B UFS 2.0 (update to UFS v1.1 standard published in June 2012). JESD220B Universal Flash Storage v2.0 offers increased link bandwidth for performance improvement, a security features extension and additional power saving features over the UFS v1.1.

On 30 January 2018 JEDEC published version 3.0 of the UFS standard, with a higher 11.6 Gbit/s data rate per lane (1450 MB/s) with the use of MIPI M-PHY v4.1 and UniProSM v1.8. At the MWC 2018, Samsung unveiled embedded UFS v3.0 and uMCP (UFS-based multi-chip package) solutions.

On 30 January 2020 JEDEC published version 3.1 of the UFS standard. UFS 3.1 introduces Write Booster, Deep Sleep,  Performance Throttling Notification and Host Performance Booster for faster, more power efficient and cheaper UFS solutions. The Host Performance Booster feature is optional.

In 2022 Samsung announced version 4.0 doubling from 11.6 Gbit/s to 23.2 Gbit/s with the use of MIPI M-PHY v5.0 and UniPro v2.0.

Notable devices
In February 2013, semiconductor company Toshiba Memory (now Kioxia) started shipping samples of a 64GB NAND flash chip, the first chip to support the then new UFS standard.

In April 2015, Samsung's Galaxy S6 family was the first phone to ship with  storage using the UFS 2.0 standard.

On 7 July 2016, Samsung announced its first UFS cards, in 32, 64, 128, and 256 GB storage capacities. The cards were based on the UFS 1.0 Card Extension Standard. The 256GB version was reported to offer sequential read performance up to 530 MB/s and sequential write performance up to 170 MB/s and random performance of 40,000 read IOPS and 35,000 write IOPS. However, they were apparently not actually released to the public.

On 17 November 2016, Qualcomm announced the Snapdragon 835 SoC with support for UFS 2.1.

On 14 May 2019, OnePlus introduced the OnePlus 7 and OnePlus 7 Pro, the first phones to feature built-in  3.0 (The Galaxy Fold, originally planned to be the first smartphone to feature UFS 3.0 was ultimately delayed after the OnePlus 7's launch).

The first UFS cards began to be publicly sold in early 2020. According to a Universal Flash Storage Association press release, Samsung planned to transition its products to UFS cards during 2020. Several consumer devices with UFS card slots have been released in 2020.

Version comparison

UFS

UFS Card

Implementation 
 UFS 2.0 has been implemented in Snapdragon 820 and 821. Kirin 950 and 955. Exynos 7420.
 UFS 2.1 has been implemented in Snapdragon 712 (710&720G), 730G, 732G, 835, 845 and 855. Kirin 960, 970 and 980. Exynos 9609, 9610, 9611, 9810 and 980.
 UFS 3.0 has been implemented in Snapdragon 855, 855+, 860, 865, Exynos 9820–9825, and Kirin 990.
 UFS 3.1 has been implemented in Snapdragon 855+/860, Snapdragon 865, Snapdragon 870, Snapdragon 888, Exynos 2100, and Exynos 2200.
 UFS 4.0 has been implemented in MediaTek Dimensity 9200 and Snapdragon 8 Gen 2.

Complementary UFS standards
On 30 March 2016, JEDEC published version 1.0 of the UFS Card Extension Standard (JESD220-2), which offered many of the features and much of the same functionality as the existing UFS 2.0 embedded device standard, but with additions and modifications for removable cards.

Also in March 2016, JEDEC published version 1.1 of the UFS Unified Memory Extension (JESD220-1A), version 2.1 of the UFS Host Controller Interface (UFSHCI) standard (JESD223C), and version 1.1A of the UFSHCI Unified Memory Extension standard (JESD223-1A).

On January 30, 2018, the UFS Card Extension standard was updated to version 1.1 (JESD220-2A), and the UFSHCI standard was updated to version 3.0 (JESD223D), to align with UFS version 3.0.

Rewrite cycle life
A UFS drive's rewrite life cycle affects its lifespan.  There is a limit to how many write/erase cycles a flash block can accept before it produces errors or fails altogether. Each write/erase cycle causes a flash memory cell's oxide layer to deteriorate.  The reliability of a drive is based on three factors: the age of the drive, total terabytes written over time and drive writes per day. This is typical of flash memory in general.

See also 
 Memory card
 Solid-state drive
 NVM Express (NVMe)

References

External links
 JEDEC
 Universal Flash Storage Association
 Current standards of UFS and UFS Card
 Presentation by Scott Jacobson and Harish Verma at Flash Memory Summit 2013
 What is UFS 2.1 smartphone?

Solid-state computer storage
Computer-related introductions in 2016